I Need a Miracle may refer to:

"I Need a Miracle", a song by the Grateful Dead from their album Shakedown Street
"I Need a Miracle" (Third Day song)
"I Need a Miracle", a song by Cascada from their album The Annual 2007
"I Need a Miracle", a song by Coco Star
"Toca's Miracle", a song combining the above vocals with the instrumental of Fragma's song "Toca Me"
"I Need a Miracle" (Tara McDonald song), a cover of the song
"I Need a Miracle", a song by Larry Boone
"I Need a Miracle", a song by Plus One